Core inflation represents the long run trend in the price level. In measuring long run inflation, transitory price changes should be excluded. One way of accomplishing this is by excluding items frequently subject to volatile prices, like food and energy.

History 
The concept of core inflation as aggregate price growth excluding food and energy was introduced in a 1975 paper by Robert J. Gordon. This is the definition of "core inflation" most used for political purposes. The core inflation model was subsequently developed and advocated by Otto Eckstein, in a paper published in 1981.  According to the economic theory historian Mark A. Wynne, "Eckstein was the first to propose a formal definition of core inflation, as the 'trend rate of increase of the price of aggregate supply.'”

Usage 
The preferred measure by the Federal Reserve of core inflation in the United States is the change in the core personal consumption expenditures price index (PCE). This index is based on a dynamic consumption basket. Economic variables adjusted by this price deflator are expressed in  chained dollars, rather than the alternative constant-dollar measure based on a fixed goods' basket.

Since February 2000, the Federal Reserve Board’s semiannual monetary policy reports to Congress have described the Board’s outlook for inflation in terms of the PCE. Prior to that, the inflation outlook was presented in terms of the CPI. In explaining its preference for the PCE, the Board stated:

The chain-type price PCE index draws extensively on data from the consumer price index but, while not entirely free of measurement problems, has several advantages relative to the CPI. The PCE chain-type index is constructed from a formula that reflects the changing composition of spending and thereby avoids some of the upward bias associated with the fixed-weight nature of the CPI. In addition, the weights are based on a more comprehensive measure of expenditures. Finally, historical data used in the PCE price index can be revised to account for newly available information and for improvements in measurement techniques, including those that affect source data from the CPI; the result is a more consistent series over time.

—Monetary Policy Report to the Congress,
Federal Reserve Board of Governors,
Feb. 17, 2000

Previously the Federal Reserve had used the US Consumer Price Index as its preferred measure of inflation. The CPI is still used for many purposes, for example, for indexing social security. The equivalent of the CPI is also commonly used by central banks of other countries when measuring inflation. The CPI is presented monthly in the US by the Bureau of Labor Statistics. This index tends to change more on a month-to-month basis than does "core inflation".  This is because core inflation eliminates products that can have temporary price shocks (i.e. energy, food products).
Core inflation is thus intended to be an indicator and predictor of underlying long-term inflation.

Alternatives to the core inflation model
There are other ways of measuring inflation rates.

Trimming 

A trimmed mean PCE price index, which separates "noise" and "signal" means that the highest rises and declines in prices are trimmed by a certain percentage, attributing to a more accurate measurement on core inflation. In the United States, the Dallas Federal Reserve computes trimming at 19.4% at the lower tail end and 25.4% at the upper tail.

Moving average 
In 2006, an analysis by the Federal Reserve Bank of New York indicated that as a measure, core inflation was no better than a moving average of the Consumer Price Index or CPI as a predictor of inflation.

Median CPI and median PCE 
The Median CPI is usually higher than the trimmed figures for both PCE and CPI. The Cleveland Federal Reserve computes a Median CPI and a 16% trimmed mean CPI. There also is a median PCE, but it is not widely used as a predictor of inflation.

See also
Headline inflation
Inflationism
Inflation hedge

References

External links
Core Inflation: A Review of Some Conceptual Issues, Mark A.Wynne, Federal Reserve Bank of St. Louis Review, May/June 2008
OECD inflation statistics
Core Logic, Paul Krugman,  February 26, 2010 – explanation of concept and motivation

Inflation